Dennis Melville Riggin (April 11, 1936 – April 2, 2016) was a Canadian professional ice hockey player who played 18 games in the National Hockey League in two short stints with the Detroit Red Wings during the 1959–60 and 1962–63 seasons. The rest of his career, which lasted from 1954 to 1963, was spent in the minor leagues.

Post-hockey Riggin worked at Molson's for 30 years in London, Ontario and Toronto before retiring to Kincardine. His son Pat also played in the NHL as a goaltender.

Career statistics

Regular season and playoffs

Honours
 1956–57 WHL Rookie Award

References

External links
 

1936 births
2016 deaths
Calgary Stampeders (ice hockey) players
Canadian ice hockey goaltenders
Detroit Red Wings players
Edmonton Flyers (WHL) players
Hamilton Tiger Cubs players
Ice hockey people from Ontario
Ontario Hockey Association Senior A League (1890–1979) players
People from Bruce County
Pittsburgh Hornets players
Windsor Spitfires players